Argenis Alexander Méndez Zapata (born July 3, 1986) is a professional boxer best known for winning the silver medal at the junior world championships in 2004.  He is a former International Boxing Federation Super Featherweight champion.

Early life and amateur career

Argenis Mendez started boxing at the age of 12.  Mendez won featherweight silver at the World Junior Championships 2004 where he beat Eddy Flores Cotilla but lost to Eduard Ambartsumyan, in the final.

He lost in the first round of the Olympics in 2004 against the Ukrainian, Maksym Tretyak. Mendez qualified for the Olympic Games by ending up in first place at the 2nd AIBA American 2004 Olympic Qualifying Tournament in Rio de Janeiro, Brazil.

In 2005, he beat Abner Cotto on his way to winning the PanAm Championships).

He also holds several wins over Carlos Velásquez.

Defeated Naskali Jyri Jarmo on points, 20-8 at the 2005 World Amateur Boxing Championships, but lost early against Russian amateur standout Aleksei Tishchenko who had beaten him earlier in the year.

Professional career

He debuted in 2006, knocking out Jose Fonseco in the second round at Santo Domingo in the Dominican Republic. Achieving a 12 fight win streak, mainly at super featherweight, until losing a close split decision to Jaime Sandoval, wherein he knocked down Sandoval in the first round.

He came back to win 6 consecutive fight including 12-round decision victories over fringe contender Martin Honorio and former IBF super featherweight champion Cassius Baloyi. Mendez fought Honorio on May 8, 2010, in the StubHub Center in Carson, California, winning a close majority decision with scores, of 114-114,116-112, and 116-112. Honorio pressured Mendez using body attacks, while Mendez used his superior hand speed and combination punching to counter Honorio. In an IBF super featherweight title eliminator, Mendez fought Baloyi in Brakpan, Gauteng, South Africa on January 29, 2011. Mendez won a unanimous decision victory, with scores of  117-110, 117-110, and 117-111, outclassing the former champion with his speed, and combination punching.

Argenis Mendez finally got his chance for the vacant IBF super featherweight against former World Boxing Council super featherweight champion and Jorge Linares conqueror Juan Carlos Salgado. On September 10, 2011, at Zapopan, Jalisco, Mexico, Mendez lost a close decision victory to Salgado. Both boxers landed good combination punches, and fought competitively. Mendez lost a point in the fifth round for hitting behind the head, but was able to drop Salgado in the final round.

He had a quick bounce-back victory over Alex Perez, on November 18, 2011, in Santo Domingo, Dominican Republic, winning a knockout in the second round.

In April 2012, Castillo signed for the boxing promoter Acquinity Sports alongside compatriots Félix Díaz and Gilbert Lenin Castillo.

Professional boxing record

See also
List of world super-featherweight boxing champions

References

External links

1986 births
Living people
People from San Juan de la Maguana
Pan American Games competitors for the Dominican Republic
Boxers at the 2004 Summer Olympics
Olympic boxers of the Dominican Republic
Dominican Republic male boxers
Super-featherweight boxers
Lightweight boxers
World super-featherweight boxing champions
International Boxing Federation champions